The 2018 Qatar Open (also known as 2018 Qatar ExxonMobil Open for sponsorship reasons) was a men's tennis tournament played on outdoor hard courts. It was the 26th edition of the Qatar Open, and part of the ATP World Tour 250 series of the 2018 ATP World Tour. It took place at the Khalifa International Tennis and Squash Complex in Doha, Qatar, from January 1–6.

Points and prize money

Point distribution

Prize money

Singles main-draw entrants

Seeds 

 1 Rankings are as of December 25, 2017.

Other entrants 
The following players received wildcards into the singles main draw:
  Jabor Al-Mutawa
  Malek Jaziri
  Gaël Monfils

The following players received entry using a protected ranking:
  Andreas Haider-Maurer

The following players received entry from the qualifying draw:
  Mirza Bašić 
  Matteo Berrettini 
  Stefano Travaglia 
  Stefanos Tsitsipas

The following player received entry as alternate:
  Víctor Estrella Burgos

Withdrawals 
Before the tournament
  Novak Djokovic →replaced by  Víctor Estrella Burgos
  Jo-Wilfried Tsonga →replaced by  Cedrik-Marcel Stebe

During the tournament
  Dominic Thiem

Retirements 
  Cedrik-Marcel Stebe

Doubles main-draw entrants

Seeds 

 1 Rankings are as of December 25, 2017.

Other entrants 
The following pairs received wildcards into the doubles main draw:
  Tuna Altuna /  Elias Ymer
  Malek Jaziri /  Mousa Shanan Zayed

Champions

Singles 

  Gaël Monfils def.  Andrey Rublev, 6–2, 6–3

Doubles 

  Oliver Marach /  Mate Pavić def.  Jamie Murray /  Bruno Soares, 6–2, 7–6(8–6).

References

External links